Govorovo is a station on the Kalininsko-Solntsevskaya Line of the Moscow Metro. Previously planned to open in 2017, it opened on August 30, 2018, as part of line's "Ramenki" - "Rasskazovka" extension.

During planning, the station was named Teryoshkovo , but was renamed Govorovo in April 2015.

The station was located parallel to Borovskoye Shosse near the street named 50 Years of the October Revolution. The station's two exits will be between the streets.

References

Moscow Metro stations
Kalininsko-Solntsevskaya line
Railway stations in Russia opened in 2018
Railway stations located underground in Russia